Otto Schuhart (4 September 1909 – 10 March 1990) was a German submarine commander during World War II, who commanded the U-boat  and was credited with the sinking of the aircraft carrier  on 17 September 1939, the first British warship to be lost in the war.

Born in Hamburg, Schuhart joined the Reichsmarine (navy) of the Weimar Republic in 1929, transferring to the U-boat force in 1936. Following the sinking of HMS Courageous the entire crew of U-29 received the Iron Cross 2nd Class while Schuhart as commander received both classes of the Iron Cross, 2nd and 1st Class. After a further six war patrols, Schuhart became commander of the 1st U-boat Training Division and later of the 21st U-boat Flotilla. He spent the last months of the war at the Naval Academy at Mürwik. After World War II he worked in various civil jobs and in 1955 rejoined military service in the Bundesmarine of the Federal Republic of Germany. He retired in 1967 and died on 10 March 1990 in Stuttgart.

Early life and pre-war service
Schuhart was born on 4 September 1909 in Hamburg, then in the German Empire. He began his naval career with the Reichsmarine (renamed to the Kriegsmarine on 1 June 1935) on 1 April 1929. He underwent basic military training in the 2nd department of the standing ship division of the Baltic Sea in Stralsund. Schuhart was then transferred to the training ship Niobe (1 July 1929 – 11 October 1929), attaining the rank of Seekadett (officer cadet) on 10 October 1929.

Emden at the time was under the command of Lothar von Arnauld de la Perière, a U-boat commander during World War I. Schuhart sailed on Emdens third training cruise, which started on 13 January 1930 and took him and her crew to Madeira, Saint Thomas, New Orleans, Kingston/Jamaica, San Juan/Puerto Rico, Charlestown and back to Germany via Las Palmas and Santa Cruz. They returned to Wilhelmshaven on 13 May 1930. Karlsruhes first training cruise left Kiel 24 May 1930 and took its crew through the Suez Canal via the Mediterranean Sea. They then proceeded down Africa's east coast, around the Cape of Good Hope to the Angra Pequena and the Walvis Bay. The cruise continued to Lobito, Angola, where they stopped before heading to South America, from here they headed back to Germany via Vigo, Spain. They arrived back in Kiel on 12 December 1930. While stationed on Karlsruhe, he advanced in rank to Fähnrich zur See (midshipman/ensign) on 1 January 1931.

Schuhart then underwent a number of cadet training courses from 5 January 1931 to 30 September 1932. On 1 October 1932 Schuhart was assigned to the pre-dreadnought  where he stayed until 25 September 1934. On this assignment he was promoted to the first substantive officer grade of Leutnant zur See (second lieutenant) on 1 October 1933. After service as a company commander in the 3rd Naval Artillery Department (26 September 1934 – 30 September 1937) at Swinemünde where he was promoted to Oberleutnant zur See (first lieutenant) on 1 June 1935, Schuhart joined 1st U-boat Flotilla as an aide-de-camp on 1 October 1936. He attended another torpedo training course at Mürwik from 5 October 1937 to 31 October 1937 before being appointed company officer with the Unterseebootsflottille Emsmann and Hundius (1 November 1937 – 29 January 1938). In December 1938 he was given command of U-25. On 4 April 1939 Schuhart was transferred to U-29 in the Unterseebootsflottille Saltzwedel.

World War II
U-29 left Wilhelmshaven on 19 August 1939, 12 days before the German Invasion of Poland which marked the beginning of World War II in Europe. Oberleutnant zur See Georg Lassen, who had joined U-29 four days earlier, was Schuhart's I. Wachoffizier (first watch officer) on all of his seven war patrols. The last five U-boats belonged to the Unterseebootsflottille Hundius. Schuhart's orders were to patrol the sea west of Ireland. The approach was largely uneventful and was made mostly submerged up to the Faroe Islands due to the numerous fishing trawlers in the North Sea. U-29 reached its patrol area on 28 August where it stopped.

Right after the outbreak of World War II, on 17 September 1939, Schuhart encountered the British carrier HMS Courageous. After stalking her for two hours, Schuhart saw his opportunity when Courageous turned into the wind to launch her aircraft. This manoeuvre put the ship right across the bow of the U-29, which then fired three torpedoes. Two of the torpedoes struck the ship on her port side, and she capsized and sank in 15 minutes with the loss of 518 of her crew, including her captain. During the war Schuhart sank twelve ships on nine patrols, for a total of 67,277 tons of Allied merchant shipping. After transferring back to land, Schuhart became commander of 1. U-Lehr Division ("1st U-boat Training Division") and later of 21st U-boat Flotilla in Pillau. From 1944 to 1945 he was commander of I./Marineschule Flensburg-Mürwik. After the German capitulation he commanded a marine battalion until August 1945. Until December 1945 he served in the German mine clearing service.

Personal and later life
The marriage produced two children.

Following Schuhart's release from military service he worked at a factory in Satrup from January to July 1946. He then underwent training at the Gothaer fire insurance company in Hamburg until July 1947. From August 1947 to September 1948 he worked for a transportation firm in Hamburg before working for the childcare of the Evangelical Relief Fund. He was head of the vocational education department of the H. C. Stülcken Sohn shipbuilding company located in Hamburg from April 1951 until 30 November 1955. On 3 December 1955 Schuhart entered the Bundeswehr where he served in various land based capacities. Upon his retirement on 30 September 1967, he received the Bundesverdienstkreuz I class.

Awards
 Wehrmacht Long Service Award 4th Class (2 October 1936)
 Iron Cross (1939) 2nd Class & 1st Class (26 September 1939)
 War Merit Cross 2nd Class (30 January 1944) & 1st Class (1 September 1944)
 U-boat War Badge (1939) (16 December 1939)
 Knight's Cross of the Iron Cross on 16 May 1940 as Kapitänleutnant and commander of U-29
 Officer's Cross, Order of Merit of the Federal Republic of Germany (30 September 1967)

References

Citations

Bibliography

1909 births
1990 deaths
German Navy personnel
Military personnel from Hamburg
Officers Crosses of the Order of Merit of the Federal Republic of Germany
Recipients of the Knight's Cross of the Iron Cross
Reichsmarine personnel
U-boat commanders (Kriegsmarine)